Pablo Andrés Escobar Valencia (born February 12, 1987) is a Colombian footballer who currently plays for Real Cartagena.

Career
Escobar began his career in his native Colombia with Deportes Quindío, and made 67 appearances for the team in the Colombian Categoría Primera A before moving to Deportivo Cali in 2009.

He joined the Kansas City Wizards of Major League Soccer in January 2010. However, he was released by the Wizards on July 2, 2010 to make way for the signing of Shavar Thomas from Philadelphia Union.

References

External links 

Entrevista en Futbolred.com

1987 births
Living people
Colombian footballers
Colombian expatriate footballers
Deportes Quindío footballers
Deportivo Cali footballers
Atlético Huila footballers
Sporting Kansas City players
Plaza Colonia players
Cúcuta Deportivo footballers
Patriotas Boyacá footballers
Jaguares de Córdoba footballers
Real Cartagena footballers
Categoría Primera A players
Categoría Primera B players
Major League Soccer players
Colombian expatriate sportspeople in Uruguay
Colombian expatriate sportspeople in the United States
Expatriate footballers in Uruguay
Expatriate soccer players in the United States
Association football defenders
Sportspeople from Valle del Cauca Department